Paul Kiernan may refer to:
 Paul Kiernan (mayor), mayor of Long Branch, New Jersey
 Paul Kiernan (bobsleigh) (born 1974), Irish bobsledder